Byington is a surname. Notable people with the surname include:

A. Homer Byington (1826–1910), U.S. Consul in Naples, newspaper publisher, and Connecticut state politician
Alberto Byington (1902–1964), Brazilian hurdler
Bianca Byington (born 1966), Brazilian actress
Bob Byington (born 1971), American film director, screenwriter and actor 
Carrie L. Byington, Mexican–American clinician and pediatric infectious disease specialist
Cyrus Byington (1793–1868), American Christian missionary
Dominique Dillon de Byington aka Dillon, (born 1988), Brazilian singer-songwriter and pianist
Elia Goode Byington (1858–1936), American journalist
Homer M. Byington Jr. (born 1908), the first American Ambassador to newly independent Malaya
John Byington (1798–1887), minister and the first president of the General Conference of Seventh-day Adventists
Lewis Francis Byington (1868–1943), American politician from California
Lisa Byington (born 1976), play-by-play announcer, studio host, and feature producer/reporter
Mark Byington (born 1976), American basketball coach and former college basketball player
Noah Henry Byington (1809–1877), American physician and politician
Olivia Byington (born 1958), Brazilian singer
Carl Byington (born 1966), American 7 Continent Marathoner, entrepreneur, and publisher
Pérola Byington (1879–1963), Brazilian philanthropist and social activist
Robert Byington Mitchell (1823–1882), brigadier general in the Union Army during the American Civil War
Robert Lewis Byington (1820–1886), Democratic politician
Spring Byington (1886–1971), American actress
Steven T. Byington  (1869–1957) American individualist anarchist

See also
Byington Ford (1890–1985), American real estate developer
Byington Mill (Frisbie & Stansfield Knitting Company), historic knitting mill located in New York
Byington Vineyard, vineyard and winery in California